Mabuchi (written: 馬渕 or 馬淵) is a Japanese surname. Notable people with the surname include:

, Japanese aviator
, Japanese politician
, Japanese actress
Hideo Mabuchi (born 1971), American physicist 
, Japanese Olympic diver 
Kaoru Mabuchi, pen name of the Japanese screenwriter Takeshi Kimura (1912–1988)
Brothers Kenichi and Takaichi Mabuchi, founders of Mabuchi Motor company
, Japanese Olympic diver, husband of Kanoko
, Japanese softball player
 Toshiki Mabuchi (born 1950), Japanese mathematician 
, Japanese politician 
, Japanese Olympic diver, daughter of Kanoko and Ryo

See also
, Japanese poet and philologist 
Mabuchi Motor, a Japanese manufacturing company

Japanese-language surnames